R Boötis is a variable star in the northern constellation of Boötes. Typically the star is too faint to be readily visible to the naked eye, with a brightness that fluctuates between apparent visual magnitudes of 9.98. The distance to this star is approximately  based on parallax measurements. It is drifting closer with a radial velocity of about −58 km/s.

The variability of this star was discovered by German astronomer F. W. Argelander in 1857. It is classified as a Mira-type pulsating variable that ranges in brightness from magnitude 6.0 down to 13.3 with a period of 223.11 days. The stellar classification of the star ranges from M4e to M8e, where the 'e' indicates emission features in the spectrum.

References

M-type giants
Mira variables
Emission-line stars
Boötes
Durchmusterung objects
128609
071490
Boötis, R